Cedar is the debut EP from Doves, the first release from the band after the dissolution of their previous incarnation, Sub Sub. It was self-released on the band's Casino Records label (co-founded by Rob Gretton) on 9 November 1998 on limited 10" vinyl. The epic track "The Cedar Room" later became the band's first single from their debut album Lost Souls. Following the release of the Cedar EP, Doves briefly joined Badly Drawn Boy as his backing band.

In a 2000 interview with Duke University, drummer Andy Williams said of "The Cedar Room":

Track listing

Notes
 Casino Records CHIP001.
 All tracks recorded and mixed by Doves at Frank Bough Sound Mk. II.
 Harmonica by Stuart Warburton.
 Sleeve design and artwork by Rick Myers.

References

Doves (band) albums
1998 debut EPs